was a Japanese lawyer and politician who rose to serve as Minister of Education and later Speaker of the House of Representatives in the National Diet. As a lawyer, he rose to fame in Japan as one of the defense attorneys for the perpetrators of the May 15 Incident in 1932, and then later became famous internationally when he defended former prime minister Hideki Tōjō during the Tokyo War Crimes Trials after World War II. In 1960, as Speaker of the House of Representatives, he presided over the ramming through the Diet of the U.S.-Japan Security Treaty that cemented in place the U.S.-Japan alliance and allows the United States to maintain military bases on Japanese soil.

Early life

Kiyose was born in Yumesaki village, Shikama District, Hyōgo (present-day Himeiji city) on July 5, 1884. After graduating from Kyoto Imperial University with a degree in law, he became a lawyer who specialized in tenancy disputes and patent law.

Political career

In 1920, Kiyose was elected to the National Diet as a member of the House of Representatives representing Hyōgo Prefecture's fourth district. Originally a liberal, Kiyose supported the 1925 Universal Manhood Suffrage Law but opposed the draconian Peace Preservation Law that accompanied it for allowing too much judicial discretion and thereby creating the possibility for abuse.

However, by the 1930s, Kiyose evidenced a pronounced turn toward nationalism, conservatism, and militarism, as evidenced by his volunteering for the defense of the perpetrators of the May 15 Incident in 1932.

After Japan's defeat in World War II, Kiyose was purged by the U.S. Occupation and expelled from parliament for his pro-military stance during the war. In the late 1940s, he became internationally famous as the lead defense attorney former prime minister Hideki Tōjō during the Tokyo War Crimes Trials. Having been rendered homeless by American air raids, Kiyose conducted the trial while living in a homeless shelter and had to go door to door begging for donations to fund the costs of mounting Tōjō's defense.

In 1952, Kiyose was depurged and immediately won reelection to the Diet. However, rather than return to his liberal ways of the 1920s, he retained his image as an arch-conservative by vocally advocating revision of Japan's postwar constitution to restore aspects of the prewar system.

Kiyose served as Minister of Education in the cabinet of Prime Minister Ichirō Hatoyama from 1955 to 1956. As Minister, Kiyose lamented that Japan's postwar education system did not do enough to instill patriotism in Japan's youth, and pursued policies that would make Japanese education more openly nationalistic.

By 1960, Kiyose had risen to become Speaker of the House of Representatives under the administration of Hayato Ikeda. When Kiyose became Speaker of the House, he resigned from the Liberal Democratic Party and governed as an independent, "for the sake of fairness." This was not typical for Japanese speakers of the House, but rather was Kiyose's personal habit, as he had similarly resigned his membership in the Kakushintō party after being appointed Deputy Speaker of the House following the 1928 general election.

Kiyose once again garnered international attention in 1960 when, as Speaker of the House, he presided over the ramming through the Diet of the U.S.-Japan Security Treaty, helping spark a dramatic escalation in the Anpo protests against the Treaty. Despite his supposedly neutral status, Kiyose cooperated with conservative prime minister Nobusuke Kishi in calling for a surprise snap vote on the Treaty on May 19, 1960, in what became known as the "May 19 Incident." When opposition Japan Socialist Party Diet members barricaded Kiyose in his office in an attempt to prevent him from calling a snap vote on the Treaty, Kiyose took the drastic step of summoning 500 police officers into the Diet and having the opposition lawmakers physically dragged out of the building. He then struggled his way to the rostrum amidst the scrum with the assistance of the police officers and gaveled the vote through with only members of the conservative Liberal Democratic Party present. As a result of these seemingly undemocratic actions, the Anpo protests surged to a massive scale in June 1960, ultimately forcing the resignation of the Kishi cabinet, although the Treaty did take effect on June 23.

Kiyose died on June 27, 1967. That same day, he was posthumously awarded the Order of the Rising Sun with Paulownia Flowers.

References

Citations

Bibliography

Books

|-

|-

1884 births
1967 deaths
Recipients of the Order of the Rising Sun with Paulownia Flowers
People from Hyōgo Prefecture
Kyoto University alumni
Members of the House of Representatives (Empire of Japan)
Members of the House of Representatives (Japan)
Liberal Democratic Party (Japan) politicians
Politicians from Hyōgo Prefecture